Sandlas is an Indian surname lubana community who were traditionally great salt trading and merchants community. Notable people with the surname include:

Jasmine Sandlas, Indian-American singer and television personality
V. P. Sandlas (1945–2017), Indian space scientist

See also
Sandla (disambiguation)

Indian surnames